Jazz à Juan is an annual jazz festival in Juan-les-Pins, Antibes, France. New Orleans, Louisiana, widely recognized as the "Birthplace of Jazz," is a sister city, and as a result, carnival festivities in Juan-les-Pins, including both local and New Orleans jazz bands parading through the streets, have served for years to embody that connection.

Along the Boulevard Edouard Baudoin, which runs behind the seaside stage that hosts the annual jazz festival, ceramic tiles containing handprints of more than 50 musicians who have played at the festival dot the sidewalk. Among those enshrined on the boulevard are Al Jarreau, B.B. King, Chick Corea, Clark Terry, Dave Brubeck, Dee Dee Bridgewater, Eddy Louiss, Elvin Jones, Fats Waller, Grant Green, George Benson, Hank Jones, Jack DeJohnette, Gary Peacock, Joshua Redman, Keith Jarrett, Little Richard, Milt Jackson, Oscar Peterson, Pat Metheny, Pink Floyd, Ravi Coltrane, Ray Charles, Richard Galliano, Roy Haynes, Shirley Horn, Sonny Rollins, Stéphane Grappelli, Stevie Wonder and Wynton Marsalis.
 

The Miles Davis album 1969 Miles – Festiva De Juan Pins was recorded at the 1969 edition of the festival.

References

External links

 – official site

Jazz festivals in France
Antibes